Luke Bambridge and Jonny O'Mara were the defending champions but only Bambridge chose to defend his title, partnering Marcus Daniell. Bambridge lost in the semifinals to Marcel Granollers and Ben McLachlan.

Granollers and McLachlan won the title after defeating Kwon Soon-woo and Ramkumar Ramanathan 4–6, 6–3, [10–2] in the final.

Seeds

Draw

References

External links
 Main draw

Surbiton Trophy - Men's Doubles
2019 Men's Doubles